STS-37, the thirty-ninth NASA Space Shuttle mission and the eighth flight of the Space Shuttle Atlantis, was a six-day mission with the primary objective of launching the Compton Gamma Ray Observatory (CGRO), the second of the Great Observatories program which included the visible-spectrum Hubble Space Telescope (HST), the Chandra X-ray Observatory (CXO) and the infrared Spitzer Space Telescope. The mission also featured two spacewalks, the first since 1985.

Crew

Spacewalks 
  Ross and Apt  – EVA 1
 EVA 1 Start: April 7, 1991
 EVA 1 End: April 7, 1991
 Duration: 4 hours, 32 minutes

   Ross and Apt  – EVA 2
 EVA 2 Start: April 8, 1991
 EVA 2 End: April 8, 1991
 Duration: 5 hours, 57 minutes

Crew seating arrangements

Preparations and launch 

The STS-37 mission was successfully launched from launch pad 39B at 9:22:44 a.m. EST on April 5, 1991, from the Kennedy Space Center in Florida. Resumption of the countdown after the T-9-minute hold was delayed about 4 minutes 45 seconds because of two possible weather-condition violations of the launch commit criteria (LCC). Both conditions were found acceptable and the launch countdown proceeded to a satisfactory launch to an inclination of 28.45°. Launch weight: .

Compton Gamma Ray Observatory 
The primary payload, the Compton Gamma Ray Observatory (CGRO), was deployed on flight day 3. CGRO's high-gain antenna failed to deploy on command; it was finally freed and manually deployed by Ross and Apt during an unscheduled contingency spacewalk, the first since April 1985. The following day, the two astronauts performed the first scheduled spacewalk since November 1985 to test means for astronauts to move themselves and equipment about while maintaining the then-planned Space Station Freedom. CGRO science instruments were Burst and Transient Source Experiment (BATSE), imaging Compton Telescope (COMPTEL), Energetic Gamma Ray Experiment Telescope (EGRET) and Oriented Scintillation Spectrometer Experiment (OSSE). CGRO was the second of NASA's four Great Observatories. The Hubble Space Telescope, deployed during Mission STS-31 in April 1990, was the first. CGRO was launched on a two-year mission to search for the high-energy celestial gamma ray emissions, which cannot penetrate Earth's atmosphere. It was also designed to be the first satellite that could be refueled in orbit by Shuttle crews. Five months after deployment, NASA renamed the satellite the Arthur Holly Compton Gamma Ray Observatory, or Compton Observatory, after the Nobel Prize-winning physicist who did important work in gamma-ray astronomy.

Spacewalks 

The first U.S. extravehicular activity (EVA) or spacewalk since 1985 was performed by Mission Specialists Ross and Apt after six failed attempts to deploy the satellite's high-gain antenna. Repeated commands by ground controllers at the Payload Operations Control Center, Goddard Space Flight Center, Greenbelt, Maryland, and maneuvering of Atlantis and its Remote Manipulator System (Canadarm) robot arm, as well as CGRO's antenna dish, were to no avail in dislodging the boom. Ross and Apt were prepared for such a contingency, and Ross freed the antenna boom within 17 minutes after beginning the spacewalk. It was the first unscheduled contingency EVA since STS-51-D in April 1985. Deployment occurred about 18:35 EST, approximately 4 hours after it was scheduled.

The following day, on April 8, 1991, Ross and Apt made the first scheduled EVA since Mission STS-61-B in November 1985. The spacewalk was to test methods of moving crew members and equipment around the future Space Station Freedom. One of the experiments was to evaluate manual, mechanical and electrical power methods of moving carts around the outside of large structures in space. Although all three methods worked, the astronauts reported that propelling the cart manually or hand-over-hand worked best. With both EVAs, Ross and Apt logged 10 hours and 29 minutes walking in space during STS-37. Crew members also reported success with secondary experiments.

During the second EVA, a stainless steel palm restraint bar punctured the pressure bladder of Apt's right glove. However, the astronaut's hand and silk comfort glove partially sealed the hole, resulting in no detectable depressurization. In fact, the puncture was not noticed until postflight examination.

Additional payloads and experiments 
Secondary payloads included Crew and Equipment Translation Aid (CETA), which involved scheduled six-hour spacewalk by astronauts Ross and Apt (see above); Ascent Particle Monitor (APM); Shuttle Amateur Radio Experiment (SAREX II); Protein Crystal Growth (PCG); Bioserve/Instrumentation Technology Associates Materials Dispersion Apparatus (BIMDA); Radiation Monitoring Equipment (RME Ill); and Air Force Maui Optical Site (AMOS) experiment. Among the other payloads flown was the first flight of the Bioserve/Instrumentation Technology Associates Materials Dispersion Apparatus (BIMDA) to explore the commercial potential of experiments in the biomedical, manufacturing processes and fluid sciences fields, and the Protein Crystal Growth experiment, which has flown eight times before in various forms. Astronaut Pilot Kenneth D. Cameron was the primary operator of the Shuttle Amateur Radio Experiment (SAREX), although all five crew members participated as amateur radio operators. It was arguably the first time that the astronauts received fast scan amateur television video from the ham radio club station (W5RRR) at Johnson Space Center (JSC).

During the spaceflight, the crew was additionally able to photograph the Kuwaiti oil fires on April 7, 1991, as the Gulf War was ongoing during the spaceflight.

Landing 

On April 11, 1991, at 06:55:29 PDT, Runway 33, Edwards Air Force Base, California. Rollout distance: . Rollout time: 56 seconds. Landing originally scheduled for April 10, 1991, but delayed one day due to weather conditions at Edwards and Kennedy Space Center (KSC). Orbiter returned to KSC on April 18, 1991. Landing weight: .

Due to an incorrect call on winds aloft, Atlantis landed 623 feet (190 metres) short of the lakebed runway's threshold marking. This did not present a problem, since the orbiter landed on the dry lake bed of Edwards, and a problem was not obvious to most viewers. Had the landing been attempted at the Kennedy Space Center, the result would have been a touchdown on the paved underrun preceding the runway and would have been much more obvious. Landing speed was 168 KEAS, 13 knots faster than the slowest landing of the Shuttle program, STS-28's 155 KEAS.

Mission insignia 
The three stars on the top and seven stars on the bottom of the insignia symbolize the flight's numerical designation in the Space Transportation System's mission sequence. The stars also represented the Amateur Radio term "73" or "Best regards", consistent with the fact that the entire crew had become licensed and operated the SAREX-II experiment while on orbit.

Wake-up calls 
NASA began a tradition of playing music to astronauts during the Project Gemini, and first used music to wake up a flight crew during Apollo 15. Each track is specially chosen, often by the astronauts' families, and usually has a special meaning to an individual member of the crew, or is applicable to their daily activities.

See also 

 List of human spaceflights
 List of Space Shuttle missions
 Outline of space science
 Space Shuttle

References

External links 

 NASA mission summary 
 STS-37 Video Highlights

Space Shuttle missions
Edwards Air Force Base
Spacecraft launched in 1991